Milton McCrory (born February 7, 1962 in Detroit, MI) is a former professional boxer who was a world champion in the welterweight (147lb) division.

Amateur 
Milton had a reported amateur record of 105-15. He lost in the 1979 National AAU finals to Lemuel Steeples and in the Olympic Trials to Johnny Bumphus.

Personal life 
McCrory is the brother of former champion Steve McCrory and grew up in Detroit, Michigan. Mccrory had dreams of becoming a basketballer but soon developed a passion for boxing. In 1979, he won the welterweight title at the World Junior Championships in Yokohama, Japan.

Pro career 
McCrory trained under the legendary Emanuel Steward in the famous Detroit Kronk Gym program.  Known as "Ice Man", McCrory turned pro in 1980 and won his first 20 bouts, establishing himself as the unified #1 contender for  the welterweight title at the time of Sugar Ray Leonard retirement. He won the vacant WBC belt—and became the first Kronk Detroit-born champion—in a rematch with Colin Jones, drawing with him in the initial matchup. He defended the title four times before losing the belt via KO in a unification match with Donald Curry in 1985. He later moved up to Light Middleweight and challenged Mike McCallum for his WBA Light Middleweight title in 1987, but lost via 10th-round TKO. He retired in 1991 after losing 2 of his last 4 fights. In his last bout, he scored a first-round knockout of Robert Curry.

Professional boxing record

See also 
 List of WBC world champions
 List of IBF world champions

References

External links 
 

1962 births
Boxers from Detroit
Light-middleweight boxers
Living people
Welterweight boxers
World welterweight boxing champions
World boxing champions
American male boxers